Samuel or Sam Parks may refer to:

Sam Parks Jr. (1909–1997), American golfer
Samuel C. Parks (1820–1917), American lawyer and jurist
Samuel Parks, character in The $5,000,000 Counterfeiting Plot

See also
Samuel Parkes (disambiguation)